Michael James Moyle (born 8 September 1971 in Dianella, Western Australia), is an Australian baseball player. He competed at the 2000 Summer Olympics.

Moyle played professional baseball in the USA for 9 years, including two seasons for the Akron Aeros at the Double-A level of Minor league baseball.

References

1971 births
Living people
Baseball people from Western Australia
Olympic baseball players of Australia
Australian baseball players
Baseball players at the 2000 Summer Olympics
Akron Aeros players
Kinston Indians players
Columbus RedStixx players
Burlington Indians players (1986–2006)
Butte Copper Kings players
Bridgeport Bluefish players